Rainton is a village in the Harrogate borough of North Yorkshire, England. The area has a village green and a maypole. There are approximately 120 houses in Rainton including six listed buildings, several period farm houses, a smithy and a dovecote. The local vernacular building style is sandstone and cobble construction with slate or pantile roof.

History 
The village was mentioned in the Domesday Book as having 30 ploughlands and belonging to Count Alan of Brittany. The name is thought to have derived from Old English (though it could be Old Norse) of the Tūn of Regna's/Rægen's .

Rainton was historically in the parish of Topcliffe in the North Riding of Yorkshire, part of the township of Rainton with Newby.  The township became a separate civil parish in 1866, and in 1974 was transferred to the new county of North Yorkshire.

Rainton was a largely agricultural village. However, since 2000, it has become a commuter village, largely due to its close proximity to the A1(M). This in turn has led to an increase in property prices which is evidenced by the large number of barn conversions and property renovations. Rainton continues to host Christmas parties for local children, lunches for retired people, and other social events including a gardening club.

Rainton is the principal settlement in the civil parish of Rainton with Newby.  Newby, historically known as Newby-on-Swale, is a deserted medieval village, now occupied by Baldersby Park (also known as Newby Park), the home of Queen Mary's School.

At the 2001 Census, the population of the parish was 354, which had risen to 447 by the time of the 2011 Census. In 2015, North Yorkshire County Council estimated that the population had fallen slightly to 440.

Facilities
The local school is based at Baldersby St James.

There are two freehold pubs in the village: The Lamb and  The Bay Horse which are both traditional village pubs. In 2011, The Lamb diversified into being a village shop as well as a pub.

A recreation field, including a children's park, opened in 2000 after local fundraising. The children's park obtained further funds to provide new equipment for older children, which was completed in 2016. The cricket club has two teams which have a new pavilion, built largely by the hands-on cricket team and villagers themselves.

There is a Methodist chapel in Rainton. The church at nearby Baldersby St James has a 'impressive' steeple.

References

Sources

External links

Parish council

Villages in North Yorkshire